The white-bibbed manakin (Corapipo leucorrhoa) is a species of bird in the family Pipridae. It is found in Colombia and Venezuela. Its natural habitats are subtropical or tropical moist lowland forest and subtropical or tropical moist montane forest.

Corapipo leucorrhoa previously included white-ruffed manakin (Corapipo altera) which has been split into a separate species.  When they were a single species Corapipo leucorrhoa was called white-ruffed manakin.

References

white-bibbed manakin
Birds of Colombia
Birds of the Venezuelan Andes
white-bibbed manakin
white-bibbed manakin
Taxonomy articles created by Polbot